The 12th Japan Record Awards took place at the Imperial Garden Theater in Chiyoda, Tokyo, on December 31, 1970, starting at 7:00PM JST. The primary ceremonies were televised in Japan on TBS.

Award winners

Japan Record Award
Yoichi Sugawara for "Kyou De Owakare"
 Lyricist: Rei Nakanishi-2nd time awarded after 2 years
 Composer: Akira Ui
 Arranger: Kenichirou Morioka-2nd time awarded after 3 years
 Record Company: Polydor Records

Best Vocalist
Vacant

Best New Artist
Akira Nishikino for "Mou Koi Nanoka"

Vocalist Award
Youko Kishi for "Kibou"
2nd time awarded after 6 years, absent the live because of collagen disease, only responding by phone call. The vocal performer that has the most potential to be the best vocal performance winner.
Hiroshi Uchiyamada and Cool Five for "Uwasa No Onna"
Saori Yuki for "Tegami"
Shinichi Mori for "Hatoba Onna No Blues"
Last year's best vocal performance winner.

General Public Award
Keiko Fuji for "Inochi Azukemas"
The Drifters for "Drift No Zundokobushi"

New Artist Award
Masaki Nomura for "Ichido Dakenara"
Ritsuko Abe for "Ai No Kizuna"
Salty Sugar for "Hashire Koutaro"
Mari Henmi for "Keiken"

Composer Award
Makoto Kawaguchi for "Manatsu No Arashi"
Singer:Teruhiko Saigō

Arrangement Award
Shunichi Makaino for "Waratte Yurushite"
Singer:Akiko Wada

Lyricist Award
Rei Nakanishi for "Showa Onna Blues"
Singer:Mina Aoe
Awarded again after 3 years, 4th composer award.

Special Award
Staff of Nippon Columbia for "Nihon Hayariuta No Ayumi"

Planning Award
Nippon Columbia for "Futari No Ginza" and "Kyoto No Koi"
Composer:The Ventures
Singer: Masako Izumi, Ken Yamauchi and Yuuko Nagisa
4th time in a row for 2 years.

Children's Song Award
Sakiko Tamagawa for "Moomin Theme"
Theme song for Moomin.

External links
Official Website

Japan Record Awards
Japan Record Awards
Japan Record Awards
Japan Record Awards
1970